Vitinha, a hypocorism of Vítor in Portuguese, may refer to:

Vitinha (footballer, born 1986), full name Vítor Tiago de Freitas Fernandes, Portuguese footballer
Vitinha (footballer, born 1991), full name Vítor Reis Alves, Portuguese footballer
Vitinha (footballer, born 1992), full name Vítor Hugo Silva Azevedo, Portuguese footballer
Vitinha (footballer, born 1999), full name Vítor Hugo de Almeida Tavares, Portuguese footballer
Vítor Oliveira (footballer, born 2000), Vítor Manuel Carvalho Oliveira, Portuguese footballer also known as Vitinha
Vitinha (footballer, born 2000), full name Vítor Machado Ferreira, Portuguese footballer
Vitinha (futsal player) (born 1969), full name Vítor Manuel da Silva Marques, Portuguese futsal player

See also